An only child is a person who does not have any siblings, neither biological nor adopted.

Only Child may also refer to:

 Only Child (novel), a novel by Jack Ketchum
 Only Child, a 2020 album by Sasha Sloan